Kártyázó asszonyok is a Hungarian play written by Sándor Hunyady. It was first produced in 1939.

Hungarian plays
1939 plays